Sergei Kuznetsov ((narkomovka),  (tarashkevitsa)) may refer to:

Sports

 Sergey Kuznetsov (athlete) (1918-2010), Soviet Olympic decathlete
 Serhiy Kuznetsov (footballer, born 1950), Soviet international footballer with FC Zorya Luhansk, FC Dynamo Kyiv, FC Zenit Leningrad and FC SKA Rostov-on-Don
 Sergey Kuznetsov (footballer, born 1960), Soviet and Russian footballer with FC Dynamo Moscow, FC Zenit St. Petersburg and FC Asmaral Moscow, Soviet champion in 1984
 Serhiy Kuznetsov (footballer, born 1963), Soviet and Ukrainian footballer with FC Metalist Kharkiv, FC Chornomorets Odessa, FC Metalurh Zaporizhya, Ferencváros and FC KAMAZ Naberezhnye Chelny
 Sergey Kuznetsov (footballer, born 1966), Soviet and Russian footballer with FC SKA Rostov-on-Don, FC Rotor Volgograd and FC Krylia Sovetov Samara
 Syarhey Kuznyatsow (born 1979), Belarusian footballer with FC Metalist Kharkiv and FC Arsenal Kyiv
 Serhiy Kuznetsov (footballer, born 1982), Ukrainian footballer
 Sergey Kuznetsov (footballer, born 1986), Russian footballer with FC Luch-Energiya Vladivostok, FC Dynamo Moscow, FC Krylia Sovetov Samara, FC Kuban Krasnodar and FC Rostov
 Sergei Kuznetsov (ice hockey), born 1980, Russian ice hockey player
 Sergey Kuznetsov (volleyball) (born 1993), Kazakhstani volleyball player
 Sergey Kuznetsov (swimmer) (born 2000), Finnish swimmer who competed at the 2018 European Aquatics Championships

Other
 Sergei Anatolyevich Kuznetsov (born 1956), Soviet and Russian actor in Dandelion Wine
 Sergey Kuznetsov (historian) (born 1960), Russian art historian
 Sergey Kuznetsov (architect) (born 1977), Chief Architect of Moscow
 Sergey Kuznetsov (writer) (born 1966), Russian writer, journalist and entrepreneur

See also
Serhiy Kurchenko (born 1985), Ukrainian businessman